La Rabassa is a locality located in the municipality of Sant Guim de Freixenet, in Province of Lleida province, Catalonia, Spain. As of 2020, it has a population of 15.

Geography 
La Rabassa is located 87km east of Lleida.

References

Populated places in the Province of Lleida